James McBratney (November 17, 1941 – May 22, 1973) was an Irish American gangster, believed to have been involved in the 1972 kidnappings of Emanuel "Manny" Gambino (nephew of Carlo Gambino) and Lucchese crime family caporegime Francesco Manzo and Gambino crime family mafioso Vincent D'Amore.

Biography
James McBratney (a.k.a. "Jimmy From Queens") was born in 1941 to emigrant Catholic parents from Northern Ireland. He first met his longtime friend and fellow Irishman, Edward Maloney at Green Haven Correctional Facility where McBratney had been convicted of armed robbery. Maloney would later describe him as a "devoted family man". He stood 6'3", weighed 250 pounds, and was an avid weightlifter. Maloney later commented about McBratney's behavior while incarcerated saying, "he was quiet, a listener and learner and soon we were discussing heists we might do together."  

He was knowledgeable about firearms and wanted to become a collector. He wanted to save up his illicit funds earned by armed robbery, kidnapping and gun running and open a night club. This would have been impossible for the liquor license board would have never awarded him the certificate because of his connections with the Gambino crime family and Colombo crime family, including his own personal extensive criminal record. It is wrongly perceived that McBratney was the leader of the kidnapping gang, while he did oversee the kidnappings he was just a "point man" and "middle man". 

Sometime in October 1972, Maloney was recruited to become a part of the kidnapping-ransom ring with McBratney, along with fellow Irish-American Warren Schurman and John Kilcullen, Italian-American Gambino crime family mob associate Robert Senter, a paternal uncle of Irish-Italian mob associate Anthony Senter and Colombo crime family mob associate Thomas Genovese, a distant paternal relative of Genovese crime family patriarch and founder Vito Genovese. It is unknown if McBratney had been told of the kidnapping operation by Gambino crime family street soldiers, Flippo and Ronald Miano who at the time were "made men" in the Gambino family. The Miano brothers reportedly told McBratney and the others they wanted 10% of the ransom payment and had thought up the kidnapping plan for what they called "revenge".

Kidnapping of Frank Manzo
They snatched Lucchese crime family capo Francesco Manzo in front of Jimmy Burke and Henry Hill as he was dining at Hill's restaurant The Suite in Forest Hills, New York. The kidnapping was orchestrated and conducted perfectly and McBratney and his crew members received $150,000 from Carmine Tramunti for Manzo's safe return. Following the kidnapping of Frank Manzo, McBratney and the crew conducted two more successful kidnappings of members of organized crime.

The kidnapping of "Junior"
On December 28, 1972, McBratney made arrangements to kidnap a Gambino crime family loanshark who Jerry Capeci and fellow investigative journalists only identify as "Junior". The loanshark was allegedly Vincent D'Amore, a capo in the Gambino crime family. Maloney approached "Junior" on the street, shoved a handgun into his stomach, and forced him into nearby waiting vehicle with McBratney, Genovese and Shurman. Junior fought his attempted kidnappers and Maloney pistolwhipped him before forcing him into the car's backseat so the gang could make a quick retreat. Unfortunately for McBratney and the others, two young boys witnessed the kidnapping, recording the license plate and turned it over to a relative with connections to organized crime.

Shortly after leaving the scene, McBratney realized that in all the commotion and pandemonium, Warren Schurman had forgotten to put tape over "Junior"'s eyes. Enraged at Schurman's incompetence and lack of preparation, he slammed on the brakes to yell at them. When the car came to an abrupt stop "Junior" ran for his life as McBratney opened fire on him. Schurman jumped out of the car and doubled back to Maloney who was driving a vehicle behind them, with Genovese. Maloney later stated he was sure McBratney was going to murder Schurman for his mistake.

Gangland slaying
McBratney was at Snoope's Bar and Grill on Staten Island on May 22, 1973. He had left his machine gun in his Cadillac. He ordered a drink, when Gambino crime family associates John Gotti, Angelo Ruggiero, and Ralph Galione came in. They strode to the rear of the bar where he sat. Ruggiero was on his left, Galione on his right, and Gotti behind; Galione had a gun, Ruggiero a pair of handcuffs. The three of them began pulling McBratney up and away from the bar. Galione told him, "You're under arrest. You've been this route before; don't give us any trouble." After a patron attempted to intervene Galione fired two shots into the ceiling of the restaurant. Galione ordered the other patrons and employees, including a young 16 year old dishwasher, to stand against a wall, but a waitress had slipped away and called the police from a payphone. McBratney struggled with Ruggiero, Gotti, and Galione and managed to drag all of them several feet toward the end of the bar, but could not get free. Galione walked toward McBratney, who was standing between Gotti and Ruggiero, and fired three times at close range, killing him. The murder is referenced somewhat inaccurately in the 1996 HBO made-for-TV film Gotti, in a murder which helped to establish Gotti as a force in the Gambino crime family.

References

1941 births
1973 deaths
Gambino crime family
American gangsters
Criminals from Queens, New York
Gangsters from New York City
Murdered American gangsters of Irish descent
People murdered by the Gambino crime family
Deaths by firearm in Staten Island
People murdered in New York City
Male murder victims